Shriram Sharma was an Indian author and freedom fighter. He founded All World Gayatri Pariwar which has 150 million members and 5000 centers worldwide and Dev Sanskriti Vishwavidyalaya. He praised the significance of Gayatri Mantra. He is the writer of more than three thousand four hundred(3400) booklets.he is Interpreter of Entire Vedic Scripture – Vedas, Puranas, Upanishads. he is Pioneer of Scientific Spirituality.

Personal life 
He was born on September 20, 1911, in Agra, Uttar Pradesh. He wanted the betterment and upliftment of society. His father was Rupkishore Sharma. He used to teach children under a mango tree. He died on June 2, 1990. Gayatri Jayanti and Mahanirvana Divas are celebrated together on the occasion of his death date. He considered Mahatma Gandhi as his spiritual master.

Honor 

 In 1991 India Post issued a stamp bearing his likeness.
 In 2022, Shivraj Singh Chouhan, Chief Minister Of Madhya Pradesh paid tribute to him in Shantikunj.

References 

1911 births
1990 deaths
20th-century Indian male writers
20th-century Indian non-fiction writers
Indian religious writers
Indian social reformers
Activists from Uttar Pradesh
People from Haridwar district